Dewaar: The Best of Junoon is the third compilation album and the fourteenth overall album released by Pakistani rock band, Junoon. The album is produced by the band vocalist and lead guitarist, Salman Ahmad. 

"Garaj Baras" was the soundtrack of the Bollywood movie, Paap and "Azadi" was the soundtrack of the movie based on Pakistan founder, Muhammad Ali Jinnah, Jinnah the Movie.

Track listing
All music written and composed by Ali Azmat, Salman Ahmad and Sabir Zafar, those which are not are mentioned below.

Personnel
All information is taken from the CD.

Junoon
Salman Ahmad - vocals, lead guitar
Ali Azmat - vocals, backing vocals
Brian O'Connell - bass guitar, backing vocals

Additional musicians
Vocals on "Azadi" by Samina Ahmad
Vocals on "Piya" by Morten Harket
Orchestral arrangements by Paul Schwartz

Production
Produced by Salman Ahmad
Mastered by Gus Shaw & Brian O'Connell

References

External links
 Junoon's Official Website

2004 greatest hits albums
Junoon (band) compilation albums
Urdu-language albums